Leonard Hugh Graham Greenwood (30 August 1880 – 16 November 1965) was a New Zealand classical scholar at Cambridge University.

Biography
Greenwood was born at Gisborne, New Zealand, and educated at Christ's College, Christchurch, and King's College, Cambridge, where he graduated with a double first in classics. He then lectured at Leeds University 1903–1907 and was a fellow of King's College, Cambridge, 1906–1909. In 1909 he was elected to a fellowship at Emmanuel College, Cambridge, and taught classics there for 40 years. He died in Cambridge. He was elected a member of the Cambridge Apostles in 1903.

Publications
translation of Aristotle's Nicomachean ethics, book six, Cambridge University Press, 1909 
translation of Cicero's The Verrine Orations, Heinemann, 1935
Greek tragedy compared with modern drama, Victoria University College, 1943
Aspects of Euripidean Tragedy, Cambridge University Press, 1953

References

External links

1880 births
1965 deaths
People educated at Christ's College, Christchurch
Alumni of King's College, Cambridge
Fellows of Emmanuel College, Cambridge
English classical scholars
Academics of the University of Leeds
Classical scholars of the University of Cambridge
People from Gisborne, New Zealand
New Zealand emigrants to the United Kingdom